2015 Mogadishu hotel attack may refer to:

2015 Central Hotel attack
Makka al-Mukarama hotel attack
Jazeera Palace Hotel bombing
Sahafi Hotel attacks